Kix FM 90.7 (call sign: 5KIX) is a community radio station on Kangaroo Island, South Australia.

References

External links
  Kix FM 90.7 Kangaroo Island Community Radio

Radio stations in South Australia
Community radio stations in Australia
Kangaroo Island